The Higher Law is a 1911 American silent short film drama directed by George Nichols. The film starred William Garwood and James Cruze.

External links

1911 films
1911 drama films
Thanhouser Company films
Silent American drama films
American silent short films
American black-and-white films
Films directed by George Nichols
1911 short films
1910s American films